The Sheffield Historic District is a national historic district in the Lincoln Park neighborhood of Chicago, Illinois. The district is primarily a residential area, though it also includes multiple small commercial areas. The area takes its name from Joseph and Maria Sheffield, who established a farm at the site in the late 1830s. Residential development in the area began in 1868, as European immigrants created a demand for new housing, and continued through the 1900s. The district includes examples of many of the most popular architectural styles of the late nineteenth century, with the Queen Anne and Romanesque Revival styles being especially well-represented.

The district was added to the National Register of Historic Places on January 11, 1976. Its boundaries were expanded three times in the 1980s.

References

National Register of Historic Places in Chicago
Historic districts in Chicago
Queen Anne architecture in Illinois
Romanesque Revival architecture in Illinois